Obey the Law may refer to:
 Obey the Law (1926 film), a silent film adventure-drama
 Obey the Law (1933 film), an American Pre-Code crime drama film